Odo II may refer to

 Odo II, Count of Troyes (9th century)
 Odo II, Count of Orléans (c. 852–898) 
 Odo II, Count of Blois (983–1037)
 Odo II, Margrave of the Saxon Ostmark (d. 1046)
 Odo, Count of Champagne (c.  1040 – 1115)
 Odo II of Beauvais (died 1144), bishop
 Odo II, Duke of Brittany since 1148
 Odo II, Duke of Burgundy (1118–1162)
 Odo II of Champlitte (died in 1204)